The men's 1500 m  at the 2010 KNSB Dutch Single Distance Championships in Heerenveen took place at Thialf on Sunday 1 November 2009. 26 athletes participated in the contest. The top five speed skaters qualified for the 1500 m at the 2009–10 ISU Speed Skating World Cup. Sven Kramer was the title holder.

Results

Final results

Draw

References 

Single Distance Championships
2010 Single Distance